Aaron Matthew Riley (born December 9, 1980) is a retired American mixed martial artist who most recently competed in the Lightweight division of the Ultimate Fighting Championship. A professional competitor from 1997 to 2013, he has also formerly competed in PRIDE, the IFL, Shooto, and BodogFIGHT. Aside from mixed martial arts, Riley has also competed in boxing (becoming a Golden Gloves champion) and wrestling. He is now a teacher Aid at Tell City Jr-Sr High School

Background
Riley was born and raised in Tell City, Indiana. Growing up, he watched the UFC since its first event in 1993, and fell in love with the sport of mixed martial arts. Riley competed in boxing, winning a Golden Gloves Championship, and also competed in wrestling for three years at Tell City High School.

Mixed martial arts career

Early career
Riley made his professional debut in 1997 at the age of 16 for the HOOKnSHOOT organization. He received his first career loss in his second fight via kneebar, and then won ten consecutive fights. Riley then lost two consecutive fights against future UFC veterans Yves Edwards and Falaniko Vitale.

Ultimate Fighting Championship
Riley made his UFC debut against future EliteXC Middleweight Champion and UFC Welterweight Champion Robbie Lawler at UFC 37. Riley lost the fight via unanimous decision. Four years later, he fought again for the organization against Spencer Fisher at UFC Fight Night 3, and lost via TKO.

Pride Fighting Championships, BodogFIGHT, and the IFL
Riley made his PRIDE debut at PRIDE Bushido 7 against Michihiro Omigawa, who was making his mixed martial arts debut. Riley was successful in his first and only fight with the Japanese organization, winning via head kick knockout in the first round.

Riley then participated in two bouts for the BodogFIGHT organization. His first fight was in Costa Rica, which he won via armbar and then fought against future Bellator Lightweight Champion Eddie Alvarez, but lost via knockout.

In Riley's next fight, he debuted in the International Fight League against Ryan Schultz, who was the last IFL Lightweight Champion. Riley lost the fight via unanimous decision.

Return to the UFC
Riley returned to the UFC on November 15, 2008 at UFC 91 against Jorge Gurgel. Aaron beat Gurgel by unanimous decision, winning Fight of the Night honors.

Riley next faced TUF 8 cast member Shane Nelson at UFC 96, losing via controversial first round TKO.

A rematch with Nelson was scheduled immediately, for UFC 101, which Riley won via unanimous decision (30-27, 30-27, 30-27).

At UFC 105 he was defeated by TUF winner Ross Pearson via TKO in the second round after a flying knee by Pearson opened up several cuts on Riley's face. Doctors viewed the cuts on Riley's face, and came to the conclusion that he was unable to continue.

Riley then rebounded with a unanimous decision win over Joe Brammer on May 29, 2010 at UFC 114.

Riley was expected to face UFC newcomer Pat Audinwood on September 25, 2010 at UFC 119, but Riley was forced from the card with an injury and replaced by Thiago Tavares.

Riley was defeated by Tony Ferguson on September 24, 2011 at UFC 135.  While the fight was competitive early, Ferguson landed a strong left uppercut, and Ferguson dominated the remaining two minutes of the round.  Immediately after the end of the first round, Riley told his corner that his jaw was broken. The fight was declared a TKO victory for Ferguson, as ringside doctors would not allow Riley to continue. Riley had previously suffered a broken jaw when he fought Spencer Fisher at UFC Fight Night 3.

Riley was expected to face Cody McKenzie on May 15, 2012 at UFC on Fuel TV: Korean Zombie vs. Poirier.  However, Riley was pulled from the event and replaced by promotional newcomer Marcus LeVesseur.

After nearly two years away from the sport, Riley returned to face Justin Salas on July 27, 2013 at UFC on Fox 8. He lost the back-and-forth fight by split decision. He retired from MMA following his loss to Salas.

Championships and accomplishments 
Ultimate Fighting Championship
Fight of the Night (One time) vs. Jorge Gurgel

Mixed martial arts record 

|-
|  Loss
| align=center| 30–14–1
| Justin Salas
| Decision (split)
| UFC on Fox: Johnson vs. Moraga
| 
| align=center| 3
| align=center| 5:00
| Seattle, Washington, United States
| 
|-
|  Loss
| align=center| 30–13–1
| Tony Ferguson
| TKO (corner stoppage)
| UFC 135
| 
| align=center| 1
| align=center| 5:00
| Denver, Colorado, United States
| 
|-
|  Win
| align=center| 30–12–1
| Joe Brammer
| Decision (unanimous)
| UFC 114
| 
| align=center| 3
| align=center| 5:00
| Las Vegas, Nevada, United States
| 
|-
|  Loss
| align=center| 29–12–1
| Ross Pearson
| TKO (doctor stoppage)
| UFC 105
| 
| align=center| 2
| align=center| 4:34
| Manchester, England
| 
|-
|  Win
| align=center| 29–11–1
| Shane Nelson
| Decision (unanimous)
| UFC 101
| 
| align=center| 3
| align=center| 5:00
| Philadelphia, Pennsylvania, United States
| 
|-
| Loss
| align=center| 28–11–1
| Shane Nelson
| TKO (punches)
| UFC 96
| 
| align=center| 1
| align=center| 0:44
| Columbus, Ohio, United States
| 
|-
|  Win
| align=center| 28–10–1
| Jorge Gurgel
| Decision (unanimous)
| UFC 91
| 
| align=center| 3
| align=center| 5:00
| Las Vegas, Nevada, United States
| 
|-
| Win
| align=center| 27–10–1
| Steve Claveau
| Decision (unanimous)
| Xtreme MMA 5
| 
| align=center| 3
| align=center| 5:00
| Montreal, Quebec, Canada
| 
|-
| Win
| align=center| 26–10–1
| Thiago Meller
| Decision (unanimous)
| UWC: Invasion
| 
| align=center| 3
| align=center| 5:00
| Fairfax, Virginia, United States
| 
|-
| Loss
| align=center| 
| Ryan Schultz
| Decision (unanimous)
| IFL: 2007 Team Championship Final
| 
| align=center| 3
| align=center| 4:00
| Hollywood, Florida, United States
| 
|-
| Loss
| align=center| 25–9–1
| Eddie Alvarez
| KO (punches)
| BodogFIGHT: USA vs Russia
| 
| align=center| 1
| align=center| 1:05
| Vancouver, British Columbia, Canada
| 
|-
| Win
| align=center| 25–8–1
| Darrell Smith
| Submission (armbar)
| BodogFIGHT: To the Brink of War
| 
| align=center| 2
| align=center| 2:40
| Costa Rica
| 
|-
| Loss
| align=center| 25–8–1
| Spencer Fisher
| TKO (doctor stoppage)
| UFC Fight Night 3
| 
| align=center| 1
| align=center| 5:00
| Las Vegas, Nevada, United States
| 
|-
| Win
| align=center| 24–7–1
| Michihiro Omigawa
| KO (head kick)
| PRIDE Bushido 7
| 
| align=center| 1
| align=center| 6:00
| Tokyo, Japan
| 
|-
| Win
| align=center| 23–7–1
| Andrew Chappelle
| Decision
| HOOKnSHOOT: Arnold Classic
| 
| align=center| 3
| align=center| 5:00
| Columbus, Ohio, United States
| 
|-
| Win
| align=center| 22–7–1
| Maicon Alarcao
| TKO (injury)
| AFC: Brazil 1
| 
| align=center| 1
| align=center| 4:10
| Rio de Janeiro, Brazil
| 
|-
| Win
| align=center| 21–7–1
| Nuri Shakir
| Decision (unanimous)
| HOOKnSHOOT: Live
| 
| align=center| 3
| align=center| 5:00
| Evansville, Indiana, United States
| 
|-
| Loss
| align=center| 20–7–1
| Sam Morgan
| Submission (armbar)
| Shooto USA – Warrior Spirit: Evolution
| 
| align=center| 1
| align=center| 2:41
| Las Vegas, Nevada, United States
| 
|-
| Win
| align=center| 20–6–1
| Cedric Marks
| Submission (armbar)
| Combate Extremo
| 
| align=center| 1
| align=center| 1:40
| New Mexico
| 
|-
| Win
| align=center| 19–6–1
| Nick Gilardi
| TKO (submission to punches)
| PPKA: Ultimate Fight Night
| 
| align=center| 2
| align=center| 1:49
| Yakima, Washington, United States
| 
|-
| Loss
| align=center| 18–6–1
| Chris Lytle
| KO (punch)
| HOOKnSHOOT: Boot Camp 1.1
| 
| align=center| 1
| align=center| 3:31
| Evansville, Indiana, United States
| 
|-
| Win
| align=center| 18–5–1
| Alexandre Barros
| Decision (unanimous)
| HOOKnSHOOT: Absolute Fighting Championships 1
| 
| align=center| 3
| align=center| 5:00
| Ft. Lauderdale, Florida, United States
| 
|-
| Loss
| align=center| 17–5–1
| Robbie Lawler
| Decision (unanimous)
| UFC 37
| 
| align=center| 3
| align=center| 5:00
| Bossier City, Louisiana, United States
| 
|-
| Win
| align=center| 17–4–1
| Mike Willus
| TKO (strikes)
| HOOKnSHOOT: Kings 1
| 
| align=center| 1
| align=center| N/A
| Evansville, Indiana, United States
| 
|-
| Loss
| align=center| 16–4–1
| Yves Edwards
| Decision (unanimous)
| HOOKnSHOOT: Showdown
| 
| align=center| 3
| align=center| 5:00
| Evansville, Indiana, United States
| 
|-
| Win
| align=center| 16–3–1
| Earl Thompson
| Submission (armbar)
| UFCF: War 2001
| 
| align=center| 1
| align=center| 2:08
| Kirkland, Washington, United States
| 
|-
| Win
| align=center| 15–3–1
| Steve Berger
| Decision (unanimous)
| HOOKnSHOOT: Triumph
| 
| align=center| 3
| align=center| 5:00
| Evansville, Indiana, United States
| 
|-
| Win
| align=center| 14–3–1
| Aaron Stregles
| KO (punches)
| Talon Challenge 2
| 
| align=center| 1
| align=center| N/A
| Harlingen, Texas, United States
| 
|-
| Win
| align=center| 13–3–1
| Jeremy Bennett
| KO (punches)
| HOOKnSHOOT: Double Fury 1
| 
| align=center| 1
| align=center| N/A
| United States
| 
|-
| Win
| align=center| 12–3–1
| Colin O'Rourke
| Decision (majority)
| WEF 8: Goin' Platinum
| 
| align=center| 3
| align=center| 4:00
| Rome, Georgia, United States
| 
|-
| Loss
| align=center| 11–3–1
| Falaniko Vitale
| TKO (punches)
| RITC 2: Marching of the Warriors
| 
| align=center| 1
| align=center| 7:06
| Honolulu, Hawaii, United States
| 
|-
| Loss
| align=center| 11–2–1
| Yves Edwards
| Decision
| HOOKnSHOOT: Texas Heat
| 
| align=center| 1
| align=center| 20:00
| Texas, United States
| 
|-
| Win
| align=center| 11–1–1
| Joe Merit
| Submission (armbar)
| Lionheart Invitational
| 
| align=center| 1
| align=center| 2:24
| Georgia, United States
| 
|-
| Draw
| align=center| 10–1–1
| CJ Fernandes
| Draw
| Submission Fighting Championships 8
| 
| align=center| 1
| align=center| 15:00
| Belleville, Illinois, United States
| 
|-
| Win
| align=center| 10–1
| Billy Johnson
| TKO (submission to punches)
| HOOKnSHOOT: Breakout
| 
| align=center| 1
| align=center| 2:10
| Evansville, Indiana, United States
| 
|-
| Win
| align=center| 9–1
| Rob Tallack
| TKO (punches)
| Kakidamisi 1: Samurai Challenge
| 
| align=center| 1
| align=center| 2:52
| United States
| 
|-
| Win
| align=center| 8–1
| Tony Apponte
| TKO (submission to punches)
| Extreme Shootout
| 
| align=center| 1
| align=center| 7:31
| McAllen, Texas, United States
| 
|-
| Win
| align=center| 7–1
| James Julian
| Submission (armbar)
| Submission Fighting Championships 6
| 
| align=center| 1
| align=center| N/A
| O'Fallon, Illinois, United States
| 
|-
| Win
| align=center| 6–1
| Shane Garrett
| Decision (unanimous)
| HOOKnSHOOT: Horizon
| 
| align=center| 1
| align=center| 20:00
| Evansville, Indiana, United States
| 
|-
| Win
| align=center| 5–1
| Phil Stroffolino
| TKO (submission to punches)
| HOOKnSHOOT: Eruption
| 
| align=center| 1
| align=center| 3:27
| Evansville, Indiana, United States
| 
|-
| Win
| align=center| 4–1
| Brian Boclair
| Submission (armbar)
| HOOKnSHOOT: Quest
| 
| align=center| 1
| align=center| 1:35
| United States
| 
|-
| Win
| align=center| 3–1
| Chris Mounce
| Submission (keylock)
| HOOKnSHOOT: N-Vision
| 
| align=center| N/A
| align=center| N/A
| United States
| 
|-
| Win
| align=center| 2–1
| Billy Johnson
| Submission (armbar)
| HOOKnSHOOT: Elite
| 
| align=center| 1
| align=center| 5:08
| Indiana, United States
| 
|-
| Loss
| align=center| 1–1
| Mario Roberto
| Submission (kneebar)
| HOOKnSHOOT: When Worlds Collide
| 
| align=center| N/A
| align=center| N/A
| United States
| 
|-
| Win
| align=center| 1–0
| Chris Malgieri
| Submission (heel hook)
| HOOKnSHOOT: When Worlds Collide
| 
| align=center| N/A
| align=center| N/A
| United States
|

References

External links
Official UFC Profile

 Instructor Profile at Jeff Gordon's Mixed Martial Arts Academy

American male mixed martial artists
Living people
1980 births
People from Tell City, Indiana
Welterweight mixed martial artists
Mixed martial artists from Indiana
Lightweight mixed martial artists
Mixed martial artists utilizing boxing
Mixed martial artists utilizing wrestling
Ultimate Fighting Championship male fighters
American male boxers
American male sport wrestlers